Nozemskiye Isady is a rural locality (a village) in Staroselskoye Rural Settlement, Mezhdurechensky District, Vologda Oblast, Russia. The population was 31 as of 2002.

Geography 
Nozemskiye Isady is located 30 km southwest of Shuyskoye (the district's administrative centre) by road. Pristan Isady is the nearest rural locality.

References 

Rural localities in Mezhdurechensky District, Vologda Oblast